Ludwig Geyer (August 18, 1904 in  – January 31, 1992 in Pirmasens) was a German cyclist. He won the Tour de Suisse in 1934.

Major results

1929
2nd Tour de Berne
2nd Züri-Metzgete
1930
2nd stage Deutschland Tour
2nd Berlin-Cottbus-Berlin
1933
3rd Grand Prix de Vannes
3rd Paris–Tours
3rd Trophée des grimpeurs
4th Paris-Roubaix
5th Milan–San Remo
7th Giro d'Italia
1934
1st Tour de Suisse
4th stage
2nd Tour de Berlin
2nd German National Road Race Championships
7th Tour de France
1937
4th stage Deutschland Tour
2nd Deutschland Tour
1939
7th stage Deutschland Tour

Grand tour results

Tour de France
1931: 19th
1932: 22nd
1933: 12th
1934: 7th
1937: 28th

Giro d'Italia
1932: 35th
1933: 7th

References

1904 births
1992 deaths
German male cyclists
People from Schweinfurt (district)
Sportspeople from Lower Franconia
Cyclists from Bavaria
Tour de Suisse stage winners
20th-century German people